Once machos is a 2017 Peruvian sports comedy film directed, co-written, produced and starred by Aldo Miyashiro.

Synopsis 
The story of a neighborhood that bets on a football match the only thing they have in life, their houses. Once machos (Eleven males), a neighborhood team accustomed only to losing, will face Los Diamantes, a professional soccer team belonging to Jaime, former neighbor and villain of the story, who intends to knock down the entire neighborhood to build the most impressive shopping center in the country.

Cast 

 Pietro Sibille as 'Mono'
 André Silva as Andy (Andi)
 Andrés Salas as 'Chato'
 Luigi Monteghirfo as Luis
 Sebastian Monteghirfo as Sebastián (Sebas)
 Martín Arredondo as 'Dientes'
 Daniel Peredo as Daniel (Dani) / Narrator
 Iván Chávez as Chávez
 Cristian Rivero as Cristian (Cris)
 Gilberto Nué as Gilberto (Gil)
 Junior Silva as Junior
 Yaco Eskenazi as Mikael
 Aldo Miyashiro as Alejandro
 Carlos Gassols as Mr. Carlos
 Erika Villalobos as Beatriz
 Vanessa Saba as Cristina
 Wendy Ramos as Tatiana
 Amparo Brambilla as Amparo (La Amparo)
 César Valer as Don Amador
 Américo Zuñiga as Don Ulises
 Daniela Nunes as Mía
 Abril Cárdenas as Camila
 Mariano García-Rosell as Adrián
 Brando Gallesi as Bruno
 Fabiana Valcárcel as Fernanda
 Ricardo Valverde as 'Pájaro-Perro'
 Nicolás Argolo as Nico
 Yiddá Eslava as Yiddá
 Julián Zucchi as Julián (Juli)
 Eddie Fleischman as Himself
 Haysen Percovich as Jaime
 Sonia Seminario as Mrs. Luzmila

Reception

Critical reception 
In a review of the newspaper El Comercio, critic Sebastián Pimentel: gave the film a very low rating and described that "the psychological content is reduced to a matter of actions obvious, set phrases or grimaces of café-theater. The possibility of a popular, intelligent and imaginative Peruvian cinema is once again far from the big screen".

Box-office 
In its billboard debut, the Peruvian comedy Once Machos achieved 45,000 viewers; becoming the most watched Peruvian film of 2017, surpassing "Cebiche de Tiburón", "Av. Larco" and "Gemelos sin cura".

Sequels 
With the success of Once machos, a sequel entitled Once machos 2 (Eleven males 2) was announced, this time without the participation of Daniel Peredo, who had died in early 2018. After the success of the sequel, the realization of a third part was confirmed, along with a new series titled Once machos, la serie (Eleven males, the series) to premiere in 2020. but they were never released, and it is unknown what happened to these projects.

References

External links 
 

2017 films
2017 comedy films
Peruvian sports comedy films
2010s sports comedy films
2010s Peruvian films
2010s Spanish-language films
Films set in Peru
Films shot in Peru
Films about sportspeople
Films about friendship